Sambangi Venkatachina Appala Naidu is an Indian politician who is serving as Member of 15th Andhra Pradesh Assembly from Bobbili Assembly constituency.

References 

Andhra Pradesh MLAs 2019–2024
Year of birth missing (living people)
Living people